The Laird LC-DW300 and LC-DW500 Super Solution aka "Sky Buzzard" was a racing biplane built in the early 1930s by Matty Laird for the Cleveland Speed Foundation, Laird was already famous in the air racing circuit.  It had a large radial engine and an extremely faired windshield.  Other than being a biplane, it was similar in appearance to the Gee Bee, a more famous racer from the period.  It was an advanced design for the time because of the relatively clean aerodynamic construction and tight engine cowling.

The Super Solution was the first winner of the Bendix Trophy race from Burbank to Cleveland where it was flown by Maj. James H. Doolittle.

Development
Construction of the Super Solution started on 8 July 1931. The aircraft was complete and test flown at Ashborn Field in Chicago by 22 August 1931. Further changes were made by the Christopher Bros. in Wichita, Kansas in 1932, such as raising the seat, installing a sliding canopy, and adding retractable landing gear.

Design
Two engines were used in the Solution, the second being a geared variant that allowed a lower propeller rpm with a larger propeller. The engines ran with high-compression pistons and "doped" leaded fuel. Both produced over 500 hp from the standard 375 hp P&W R-985 Wasp Jr. S2A engine of the day.

Operational history
Initial flight tests proved the aircraft required more rudder area to maintain stability and the fixed pitch propeller needed to be adjusted to allow takeoffs under a mile in length.

1931 National Air Races piloted by Jimmy Doolittle wins the Bendix Trophy at a 223 mph average speed.
1931 Thompson Trophy - Trial runs prove difficult, with aileron reversal occurring at speed. The main wing spar crushed from race loads, requires steel patches. Doolittle drops out of the race with engine trouble due to a scuffed piston.
1931 In October, Doolittle flies the Super Solution on a flight between Ottawa, Ontario, Washington D.C., and Mexico City, setting a new speed record between the capitals of 12 hours, 36 minutes.
1932 In August, the Shell Oil sponsored Solution is test flown by Doolittle with new retractable gear. The aircraft is damaged in a gear-up landing, and Doolittle switches to the Gee Bee R-1. The Solution is shipped to Shell Oil in St.Louis, then later donated to the Smithsonian's National Air and Space Museum by the Swallow Aircraft Company in 1948.

On display 
The EAA has a reconstructed Super Solution in their museum in Oshkosh, Wisconsin. It was presented in 1981 by Jimmy Doolittle and Mattie Laird.
Jim Moss of Washington state built the only flying reproduction, which is currently on display at Fantasy of Flight in Polk City, Florida.

Specifications (Laird Super Solution)

References

External links

The Laird Super Solution page from the Air Racing History website

Super Solution
1930s United States sport aircraft
Single-engined tractor aircraft
Biplanes
Racing aircraft
Aircraft first flown in 1931